Wayne Roger Knights (born 25 August 1970) is a New Zealand cricket umpire. Along with Tim Parlane, Knights umpired the final of the 2015–16 Ford Trophy, in January 2016. He was added to the ICC International Panel of Umpires in June 2016. He stood in his first One Day International (ODI) match on 26 December 2016, between New Zealand and Bangladesh. 

He stood in his first Twenty20 International (T20I) match on 3 January 2017, also between New Zealand and Bangladesh. He was named as one of the twelve on field umpires for the 2018 ICC Women's World Twenty20 in October 2018. He was named as one of the sixteen umpires in January 2020, for the 2020 Under-19 Cricket World Cup, in South Africa. He stood in his first Test match on 3 December 2020, between New Zealand and the West Indies.

In January 2023, he was named as one of the on-field umpires for the 2023 ICC Under-19 Women's T20 World Cup.

See also
 List of Test cricket umpires
 List of One Day International cricket umpires
 List of Twenty20 International cricket umpires

References

External links
 

1970 births
Living people
New Zealand Test cricket umpires
New Zealand cricket umpires
New Zealand One Day International cricket umpires
New Zealand Twenty20 International cricket umpires
People from Auckland